La Porte Municipal Airport  is a city-owned public-use airport located three miles (5 km) south of the central business district of La Porte, a city in La Porte County, Indiana, United States.

Although most U.S. airports use the same three-letter location identifier for the FAA and IATA, La Porte Municipal Airport is assigned PPO by the FAA and LPO by the IATA. The airport's ICAO identifier is KPPO.

Facilities and aircraft 

For the 12-month period ending December 31, 2005, the airport had 15,416 aircraft operations, an average of 42 per day: 99.7% general aviation and 0.3% air taxi. There are 78 aircraft based at this airport: 91% single-engine, 5% multi-engine and 4% jet.

References

External links 
Airport page at City of La Porte web site

Airports in Indiana
Transportation buildings and structures in LaPorte County, Indiana